Jamie Michael Morin (born 23 May 1975) is a former senior official in the United States Department of Defense. He was a private sector economist and research consultant before earning a Doctorate degree in political science from Yale University.  He then served as a professional staff member on the United States Senate Committee on the Budget.  Morin was Director of Cost Assessment and Program Evaluation at the Department of Defense. Previously, he was Assistant Secretary of the Air Force (Financial Management & Comptroller), and served concurrently as Acting Under Secretary of the Air Force from 3 July 2012 to 28 April 2013. He joined The Aerospace Corporation in 2017 as executive director of the Center for Space Policy and Strategy and vice president of Defense Systems Operations.

Education 
Morin is a native of Detroit, Michigan and a graduate of the University of Detroit Jesuit High School & Academy in 1993.  He attended Georgetown University's School of Foreign Service, graduating cum laude in 1996.  In 1998, Morin earned a master's degree with distinction in Public Administration and Public Policy from the London School of Economics.  In 2003 he received a doctorate in political science from Yale University.  His dissertation addressed the political aspects of United States defense priorities in the post-Cold War environment.

Career 
In 1995, Morin joined J.E. Austin Associates as a research assistant.  He continued with the firm until 2001, serving first as a research associate, then an economist, and finally an economic strategy specialist.  During his tenure at J.E. Austin he worked with private firms and international development agencies on economic development projects in Africa, Asia and the Balkans.

In 2001, Morin was selected as a visiting fellow at the Center for Strategic and Budgetary Assessments in Washington, D.C., where he conducted research for The Pentagon's Office of Net Assessment.  In 2002 Morin became a national fellow at the University of Virginia's Miller Center for Public Affairs in Charlottesville, Virginia.  At the University of Virginia he studied national defense policy and lectured on government policy in undergraduate and graduate courses.

In 2003, Morin became senior defense analyst for the United States Senate Committee on the Budget.  He also served as the national security advisor to the committee chairman, Senator Kent Conrad of North Dakota.  In this position Morin worked closely with members of the budget committee, and with staff from the armed services committee, foreign relations committee, and appropriations committee to ensure the committees delivered consistent public policy recommendations to the Senate.

Following the 2008 presidential election, Morin served as a defense policy adviser on President Barack Obama's transition team.  On 11 May 2009, President Obama nominated Morin to be Assistant Secretary of the Air Force for Financial Management and Comptroller.  On 19 June the United States Senate confirmed him as the 21st Assistant Secretary of the Air Force for Financial Management and Comptroller.  Morin was 34 years old at the time of his appointment.

As the Air Force's chief financial officer, Morin was responsible for managing an annual budget of $160 billion.  He supported professional training and education programs that help financial managers produce better budget projections and financial analysis for decision makers throughout the Air Force.  Morin directed cost estimating and economic analysis programs through the Air Force Cost Analysis Agency.  He was also responsible for the Air Force Financial Services Center, which provides financial services to 650,000 Airmen and civilian employees around the world.

In his role as Assistant Secretary, Morin emphasized the need to take care of America's Airmen.  He placed the high priority on strengthening the Air Force's nuclear enterprise, which was demonstrated by his strong support for the stand-up of Air Force Global Strike Command.  Morin promoted thoughtful decision-making at all levels within the Air Force and has fostered a culture of continuous improvement.  He encouraged Air Force comptrollers to become their commander's trusted advisor in order to ensure available funds are used to achieve the greatest impact on Air Force operations and weapon system acquisition programs.

As Acting Under Secretary of the Air Force, Morin was responsible for Department of the Air Force affairs on behalf of the Secretary of the Air Force, including the organizing, training, equipping and providing for the welfare of its more than 333,000 active duty men and women, 178,000 Air National Guard and the Air Force Reserve members, 182,000 civilians, and their families. He also oversaw the Air Force's annual budget of more than $110 billion and serves as acting Secretary of the Air Force in the Secretary's absence. As acting Under Secretary, Dr. Morin also served as the Chief Management Officer of the Air Force, the senior Air Force energy official, and the focal point for space policy issues within Air Force Headquarters.

On 25 June 2014, the Senate confirmed Morin to be Director of Cost Assessment and Program Evaluation. He served in that role until the end of the Obama Administration on 20 January 2017. During his tenure as CAPE director, Morin was associated with efforts to develop program plans and cost estimates for the B-21 bomber and Ground Based Strategic Deterrent ICBM program, to curtail production of the Littoral Combat Ship and instead produce a more powerful frigate, to use special groups like the Strategic Capabilities Office to develop innovative upgrades to existing systems, and to modernize DOD contract cost reporting methods.

In March 2017, he joined The Aerospace Corporation as executive director of the Center for Space Policy and Strategy and vice president of Defense Systems Operations. The Aerospace Corporation is a California nonprofit that operates a federally funded R&D center (FFRDC) focused on national security space; the Center for Space Policy and Strategy is a specialized branch within the corporation established to promote the development of well-informed, technically defensible, and forward-looking space and technology policy.

Professional associations 
Morin is a member of the Air Force Association and holds the Certified Defense Financial Manager certification with acquisition specialty of the American Society of Military Comptrollers.  In 2013, he was named as a "Young Global Leader" by the World Economic Forum. In addition, he is a member of the Council on Foreign Relations.

References

External links 

U.S. Air Force

Center for Space Policy and Strategy
Official Aerospace biography
Government Matters (31 April 2017)
PoliticoSpace: The New American Space Age (12 Sept. 2017)
Here's What the Pentagon's Top Cost Estimator Has to Say About the Death Star (21 December 2015)
Boy Scouts of America, Order of the Arrow, Lodge 162, Migisi Opawgan, Lodge History
U.S. Senate, Committee on Armed Services, Nomination Hon. Jamie M. Morin as Director of Cost Assessment And Program Evaluation (CAPE)

|-

|-

1975 births
Alumni of the London School of Economics
Georgetown University alumni
Living people
Obama administration personnel
People from Detroit
United States Department of Defense officials
Yale University alumni